SkilledUp is a company that curates online courses. It indexes courses from providers including Coursera, edX, Udacity, Udemy, and lynda.com. These courses generally teach different job skills including programming, web development, graphic design, and marketing. Its search tool is also an API that is used by Elance University. 

SkilledUp has a "Learning Hub" with articles about the curated courses and articles on related subjects such as careers, experts on skills, and online education. SkilledUp's blog provides additional articles that discuss relevant topics rather than reporting on courses.

SkilledUp is a small company based in Manhattan. It launched its site in July 2012. It has since been reported on by publications such as The Wall Street Journal, Lifehacker, TechCrunch, and US News.

References 

American educational websites